Vladimir Iosifovich Tatarchuk (born 25 April 1966) is a retired Soviet (Ukrainian SSR, Russian SFSR) and Russian football player. His son Vladimir Tatarchuk Jr. is also a Russian professional footballer.

Honors
 Olympic champion: 1988.
 Soviet Top League winner: 1991
 Soviet Cup winner: 1991.

International career
Tatarchuk made his debut for USSR on 18 April 1987 in a friendly against Sweden. He played in the UEFA Euro 1992 and 1994 FIFA World Cup qualifiers, but was not selected for the final tournament squad for either. He scored a goal on 21 May 1991 at Wembley Stadium in a friendly against England.

External links
 Player profile

References

1966 births
Living people
Russian people of Ukrainian descent
Dual internationalists (football)
Soviet footballers
Soviet Union international footballers
Russian footballers
Russia international footballers
Russian expatriate footballers
Expatriate footballers in the Czech Republic
Expatriate footballers in Czechoslovakia
Expatriate footballers in Saudi Arabia
Expatriate footballers in Latvia
Russian football managers
FC Karpaty Lviv players
FC Dynamo Kyiv players
PFC CSKA Moscow players
Soviet Top League players
Russian Premier League players
Latvian Higher League players
SK Slavia Prague players
FK Liepājas Metalurgs players
FC Sokol Saratov players
Olympic footballers of the Soviet Union
Olympic gold medalists for the Soviet Union
Footballers at the 1988 Summer Olympics
FC Tyumen players
FC Lokomotiv Nizhny Novgorod players
Olympic medalists in football
Medalists at the 1988 Summer Olympics
Association football midfielders
FC Yenisey Krasnoyarsk players